Bruce Filosa is an American retired college athletics administrator and former football coach. He was the athletics director at Brooklyn College from 1994 to 2023. Filosa served as head football coach at Brooklyn College from 1983 through the schools' final season of football in 1990, compiling a record of 14–54. He came to Brooklyn College in 1981 as an assistant football coach after working in the same capacity at Sheepshead Bay High School.

Head coaching record

Football

References

External links
 Brooklyn profile

Year of birth missing (living people)
Living people
Brooklyn Bulldogs athletic directors
Brooklyn Kingsmen football coaches
College softball coaches in the United States
High school football coaches in New York (state)
Sportspeople from Brooklyn
Coaches of American football from New York (state)